The 2021 Oman Tri-Nation Series was the 7th round of the 2019–2023 ICC Cricket World Cup League 2 cricket tournament that took place in Oman in September and October 2021. It was a tri-nation series between Oman, Papua New Guinea and the Scotland cricket teams, with the matches played as One Day International (ODI) fixtures. The ICC Cricket World Cup League 2 formed part of the qualification pathway to the 2023 Cricket World Cup. Originally, the series was scheduled to take place in November and December 2022, but was brought forward to September 2021 by Oman Cricket. In August 2021, the International Cricket Council (ICC) announced the full schedule of the series.

Scotland won their first three matches, with Oman winning two of their fixtures, and Papua New Guinea remaining winless in the Cricket World Cup League 2 tournament. The sixth and final match of the series, between Oman and Scotland, was abandoned mid-way through Scotland's innings due to heavy rain caused by Cyclone Shaheen.

Squads

Fixtures

1st ODI

2nd ODI

3rd ODI

4th ODI

5th ODI

6th ODI

References

External links
 Series home at ESPN Cricinfo

2021 in Omani cricket
2021 in Papua New Guinean cricket
2021 in Scottish cricket
International cricket competitions in 2021–22
Oman
Oman Tri-Nation Series
Oman Tri-Nation Series